David Lee Chalk (born August 30, 1950) is an American former professional baseball player, whose primary positions were third base and shortstop. Chalk appeared in 903 games over nine seasons (–) in Major League Baseball for four teams, and was a two-time American League All-Star.

Chalk played varsity baseball for Justin F. Kimball High School in Dallas, where he was named all-city for two years before graduating in 1968. He also attended the University of Texas at Austin, where he was a three-time All-American and four-time All-Southwest-Conference selection between 1969 and 1972, appearing in three College World Series. The California Angels then selected him in the first round of the June 1972 amateur draft. His first MLB game occurred at the end of his second pro season when, during an extended September audition, he appeared in 24 games, starting 20 of them as the Angels' shortstop. The following year, Chalk started 95 games at shortstop and another 38 at third base, and made the All-Star team for the first time. In the 1974 Midsummer Classic, played at Pittsburgh's Three Rivers Stadium, Chalk replaced starter (and Baseball Hall of Famer Brooks Robinson) as the Junior Circuit's third baseman in the eighth inning; he handled no chances on defense, then struck out in his only at bat, against Mike Marshall in the ninth, and the National League breezed to a 7–2 win.

In 1975, he started 149 games at shortstop, batted .273, and set a career high with 56 runs batted in. Selected to the 1975 AL All-Star team, he did not appear in that summer's game, played at Milwaukee County Stadium on July 15. In 1977, Chalk was the Angels' regular third baseman, starting 137 games, and he achieved personal bests in hits (144), doubles (27), and batting average (.277). Along the way, as a member of the 1980 American League champion Royals, Chalk appeared in his only World Series. In Game 2, he came in for another future Hall of Fame third baseman, George Brett, in the sixth inning. He batted once, against yet another Hall of Famer, Steve Carlton, and played a key role in a three-run rally by drawing a base on balls; he then stole second base and scored on an Amos Otis double. But the Royals could not hold their 4–2 lead, and the opposing Philadelphia Phillies took the game, 6–4, and, eventually, the World Series itself.

Chalk retired from baseball after the 1981 campaign. In his 903 big-league games, he collected 733 hits, with 107 doubles, nine triples and 15 career home runs. He batted .252 lifetime and was credited with 243 runs batted in. He later scouted for the Seattle Mariners.

In 2019, Chalk was inducted into the National College Baseball Hall of Fame. He is also a member of the Texas Hall of Honor and the Texas Baseball Hall of Fame.

References

External links

1950 births
Living people
American League All-Stars
Baseball players from Texas
California Angels players
El Paso Sun Kings players
Kansas City Royals players
Major League Baseball infielders
Major League Baseball second basemen
Major League Baseball shortstops
Major League Baseball third basemen
National College Baseball Hall of Fame inductees
Oakland Athletics players
People from Del Rio, Texas
Texas Longhorns baseball players
Texas Rangers players
Salt Lake City Angels players
Seattle Mariners scouts
Shreveport Captains players